Balak is a village in the Sisian Municipality of the Syunik Province in Armenia.

Demographics 
The Statistical Committee of Armenia reported its population as 213 in 2010, down from 223 at the 2001 census.

References 

Populated places in Syunik Province